Edwin Bibiano Abath (born 2 December 1958) is an Aruban politician and former singer who served as Minister Plenipotentiary of Aruba from 1 November 2009 to 13 November 2013. From 1999 until 2005 he was a Member of Parliament for the Aruban People's Party in the Estates of Aruba. He represented Aruba as a singer in the 1988 OTI Festival.

Biography
Abath was born in Aruba, one of the Caribbean islands of the Lesser Antilles and a country of the Kingdom of the Netherlands. After he finished havo on Aruba, he went to Radboud University Nijmegen in the Netherlands to study logopaedics. He practised as a logopaedic at Dr. Horacio E. Oduber Hospital in Aruba.

Music
In 1988 he collaborated with Venezuelan pop singer Devorah Sasha in  the single "Simplemente Así" sung in both English and Spanish.

References

1958 births
Living people
Aruban People's Party politicians
Dutch civil servants
Members of the Estates of Aruba
Ministers plenipotentiary (Aruba)
Radboud University Nijmegen alumni
Speech and language pathologists